Goffe is a surname, and may refer to:

 John Goffe, Colonial American soldier
 Lloyd Goffe (1913–1984), motorcycle speedway rider
 Rusty Goffe, British dwarf entertainer
 Stephen Goffe
 Thomas Goffe, Jacobean dramatist
 William Goffe, English Regicide

See also
 Goff
 Gough (disambiguation)